There are hundreds of thousands of Indians in Bangladesh. Citing the results of a survey, a column in The Financial Express claims that as many as 500,000 Indians were staying illegally in Bangladesh in 2009. The article claims that they were found working in different establishments such as NGOs, garments, textile, IT and sent money back home through hundi transfer systems.

On 26 June 2021, Bangladeshi army patrolmen arrested 11 Indians from the construction site of Padma Bridge. They were detained immediately, and cases were filed against them for illegally trespassing. "They appeared to be acting abnormally," said the superintendent of police (Naria circle) in Shariatpur. They were sent to jail again after confirming their stable mental condition in a mental healthcare centre.

Remittance 
Citing World Bank estimates, an article in Quartz India noted that in 2013, Bangladesh was the fifth-highest source of remittances to India. That year, Indians working in Bangladesh sent more than $3.7 billion  back to India. An op-ed article in The Daily Star mentions that this is the official figure. In contrast, the unofficial figure is estimated to be significantly more and the article claims that most of them came on tourist visas and tended to stay back.

Refugees 
In July 2016, four thousand Indians took refuge in Lalmonirhat, Bangladesh after floods in West Bengal, India.

See also
 Bangladesh–India relations

References

Bangladesh
Ethnic groups in Bangladesh